Kip Andre Diggs is an American politician and retired professional boxer. He serves as a Democratic member of the Massachusetts House of Representatives, and assumed office on January 3, 2021.

Diggs holds a record of 30-5, with three knock outs, and held North American Boxing Federation and International Boxing Organizationwelterweight titles. He fought his final match at the Cape Cod Melody Tent.

In 2020, Diggs defeated Massachusetts Representative Will Crocker in the 2020 general election. He represents the 2nd Barnstable District in the Massachusetts House of Representatives.

See also
 2021–2022 Massachusetts legislature

References

Welterweight boxers
People from Hyannis, Massachusetts
Sportspeople from Barnstable County, Massachusetts
African-American boxers
African-American state legislators in Massachusetts
Massachusetts Democrats
1966 births
Living people
American male boxers
Boxers from Michigan
Sportspeople from Grand Rapids, Michigan
Boxers from Massachusetts
21st-century African-American people
20th-century African-American sportspeople